Peng Weinan (born 10 April 2002) is a Chinese para table tennis player. He won one of the bronze medals in the men's individual C8 event at the 2020 Summer Paralympics held in Tokyo, Japan. He also won the gold medal in the men's team C8 event.

References

Living people
2002 births
Chinese male table tennis players
Paralympic table tennis players of China
Paralympic gold medalists for China
Paralympic bronze medalists for China
Paralympic medalists in table tennis
Table tennis players at the 2020 Summer Paralympics
Medalists at the 2020 Summer Paralympics
Place of birth missing (living people)